Jan Hendrik Brussaard (2 October 1899 – 4 May 1969) was a Dutch sports shooter. He competed at the 1936 Summer Olympics and 1948 Summer Olympics.

References

1899 births
1969 deaths
Dutch male sport shooters
Olympic shooters of the Netherlands
Shooters at the 1936 Summer Olympics
Shooters at the 1948 Summer Olympics
Sportspeople from Rotterdam